The West Siberian Laika or WSL, is a breed of spitz–type hunting dog. Russian publications indicate that the term West Siberian Laika loosely applied to hunting dogs originating with the Mansi and Khanty people in Ural and West Siberia, but there were no standards or registrations of WSL as such until 1930. Then WWII disrupted it for a while, but systematic breeding with registrations resumed after the war ended, in 1946. This was the time the breed began taking modern shape.  Before that hunters only knew of Mansi Laika and Khanty Laika. In early 1960 many hunters in Ural still preferred the term Mansi Laika, when speaking of West Siberian Laika. In Russian language, the term Laika originated from the word layat that means to bark. The word Laika simply means barker. Any hunting Laika is a bark pointer (pointing at animal of interest by barking and staying with the animal ). It is a versatile dog depending on use and environment, but in certain parts of the country they have become more specialized.

History
Laikas resemble those dogs that originally accompanied humans since prehistory worldwide, until they became replaced with lop-eared, specialized for certain style of hunting, cultured breeds. In large sparser populated parts of Russia, this process came at a later time and aboriginal Laika types still remain with hunters in remote northern and northeastern provinces of the country.

Deforestation of land for agriculture and industrialization in later 19th-early 20th Centuries accelerated replacement of Laikas with other popular at the time dogs. Russian experts of the late 19th century distinguished dozens of varieties of aboriginal Laikas, each associated with a particular ethnic group of indigenous people of northeastern Europe and Siberia, but none of them had been considered as purebred and pedigreed.  Russians tried to save some hunting Laikas from extinction by bringing them from different provincial parts of Russia in cities of European part of the country and breeding them pure. Starting from thirtieth and especially after WW II, they established four breeds as purebreds: the Karelo-Finnish Laika, the Russ-European Laika, the West Siberian Laika and the East Siberian Laika. They all are bark-pointing dogs and their hunting behavior is generally similar. All of them are descendants of aboriginal types of Laikas selectively sampled from large territories and lumped into the four breeds for breeding in kennels.  Among all of them, the West Siberian Laika became most popular and by present time it is most numerous Laika far beyond its original range in Russia.

thumb

Appearance

Laikas belong to northern primitive breeds retaining traits of their wild ancestor, the wolf, in the appearance and behavior. They are dogs with pointed muzzle, slightly rangy or nearly square body and often gray or gray mixed with red like in the wolf coat color predominate. They are small to medium size pariah- type dogs.

The West Siberian Laika is a medium to large size dog.

The coat of the West Siberian Laika is a double coat of harsh straight guard hairs and thick and soft undercoat. The guard hairs on the neck, around the head and shoulders are particularly long and stiff. Together with a very thick undercoat they form a ruff framing the dog's face. On the tail, the guard hair and undercoat are also longer and thicker than on the rest of the body. In wintertime, dogs living in cold climate grow hair between the toes. Although the coat quality varies individually, dogs raised in countries with cold climates have longer and thicker coats than dogs that live in warm and hot climates or dogs that are kept inside most of the time. 
Most common coat colors are wolf gray, pale red and white. The gray coat can be of various shades from almost white to very dark gray, nearly black. The gray can be mixed with red producing array of brownish and red shades. Dogs with either coat color described above may have white patches in different proportions. Pale red and white dogs may have brown noses and lips. Dogs with either coat color have so-called "zonary" pattern of distribution of pigment in each guard hair. This means guard hair has alternating bands (zones) of white with black, brown or red color. Hairs with evenly distributed pigment indicate an admixture of other than Laika breed. 
The head is wedge-shaped in the form of a triangle, flat on the top and broader between ears. In the Mansi Laika, the head is more elongate with muzzle as long as the skull from eye to occiput or slightly longer. In the Khanty Laika, the head is broader and the muzzle is as long as the skull or slightly shorter. Lips are always close and lean. A full set of large teeth with a scissors bite is typical, but dogs with vice bite also occur. The standard accepts scissors bite only. In many dogs with a scissors bite at young age the bite is changing with age and becomes a vice bite by age of 5–6 years. 
Eyes are almond-shaped, medium size, deep set and distinctly slanted. Their colors are brown to dark brown. Dogs with amber yellow and/or blue eyes rarely occur, but hunters believe that dogs with brown and dark brown eyes are better hunting dogs. According to the standard, any eye color, except brown and light brown is a fault.
Ears are always pricked and directed straight up, but their size, pointed or slightly rounded tips of ears are variable. Generally, ears of the Khanty Laika are small to medium. In the Mansi Laika, ears are medium to long. Ears can be set high and close to each other or slightly apart. 
The tail is carried high curving over the back. Details of its structure and carriage are variable among aboriginal dogs. In majority of dogs, the tip of the tail lies on the back, but some dogs have the tip of the tail rigidly curved like a fishhook. Among aboriginal dogs, there are individuals with a sickle-shaped tail, but it is considered faulty by the modern breed standard. 
The body is slightly longer than the height or nearly square and with well-muscled forequarters and hindquarters. Legs are straight and parallel. Front feet are directed forward or slightly east–west and hind legs are straight and in many dogs slightly cow-hocked. The breed standard rejects square body proportions, cow hocks and east–west position of front feet. The angulation at stifles is normally developed and look like in wild canids. Feet are strong, compact and elongate. Toes are strong, flexible and well arched.

Reproduction
The majority of females of the West Siberian Laika have one estrus per year, usually in February and March. Some females have their first estrus not fixed by a certain season. The first estrus can be at age of one to two and a half years. Russian experts do not recommend breeding Laikas until they are at least two years old. The number of puppies per litter varies from one to nine, but litters of three to seven puppies are most frequent. Females of the West Siberian Laika are good mothers and, if conditions permit, dig their own whelping dens, give birth to puppies and raise them without any assistance as soon as the food is available.

Character and behavior
The West Siberian Laika is very affectionate and devoted to the master. The majority of them bark at strangers approaching the house. Their attitude to unfamiliar people varies individually and depending on the situation. Some dogs first bark and then wag their tails, greeting the guest and allow themselves to be petted. Many West Siberian Laikas are aloof with a strange person, avoid hands and watch him suspiciously. Some dogs become protective of the master, his family and their property. Many West Siberian Laikas accept a new owner with difficulty and need time to adjust to a new place. According to standard, aggressiveness to unfamiliar people is not typical. West Siberian Laika is highly territorial and may be aggressive to other intruding dogs of the same sex. Adult Laikas, especially males, should only hunt with dogs raised in the same household. West Siberian Laika can easily learn to leave alone farm animals and are naturally capable of telling apart wild game from domesticated animals. Cats of the same household are accepted, but stray cats will be treated like game.

Utilitarian qualities

The West Siberian Laika is primarily a hunting dog. Anyone who decides on a puppy of this breed should expect a full package of traits of a typical hunting Spitz. It is an emotional dog, very observant to the habits of its master, his mood and often can foresee his intentions. It does not hesitate to express its strong feelings by barking and other noises. 
The West Siberian Laika is a poor kennel dog. If the dog is left alone, locked up in a small backyard or in a pen, some dogs develop a habit of barking, seemingly without a purpose. Permanently penned or fenced West Siberian Laikas attempt to dig under the fence or climb over it. Some dogs not trained to stay penned, try to bite the wires and thereby they damage their teeth. Once freed or turned loose, such a dog will be hard to control. It will run too far, chase other animals and likely get into trouble. West Siberian Laikas that are kept well exercised, busy with hunting and contacts with other dogs, animals and people, are content, obedient and never bark without a reason. Therefore, to make a happy dog and its owner, the right conditions of the environment for hunting plus time dedicated to the dog must be met.

All West Siberian Laikas are naturally protective against wild animals, especially predators, and some dogs are protective against strangers acting suspicious or violent. A West Siberian Laika will make a good companion dog for a hiking trip. However, its extraordinary interest in wildlife demands special attention because the dog may tree some animals and stay far behind for some time. The West Siberian Laika is a great psycho-therapy dog for able bodied active people, who like to walk a lot and hunt. He needs regular free exercising between hunting seasons. Take him for walking trips in safe places often and stay healthy.
 
If you have bears in the woods near you, this dog would be the best to warn you or your loved ones in time about the bear's presence and may even show you a treed bear. If a Laika sees a bear, they will run toward the bear, not from it, and they will be barking. When a Laika barks at a bear, their voice sounds as if they were barking at a human—very unlike when they are barking at a squirrel. Treeing squirrels and other small game comes naturally. Just take your puppy in woods and turn him loose. He will start finding his own squirrels by age of 4 to 10 months. Mansi, Khanty, Russians and any other ethnic groups of people living in Russia use the same dogs for hunting and as alarm dogs.

Some West Siberian Laikas work well herding reindeer herds. During any activity or training, hunting overrules everything else. A Mansi never minds if his Laika abandons his reindeer herd for a while, especially if his Laika finds valuable game. Mansi and Khanty use reindeer and, in some cases, horses as a draft animal, but good hunting dogs are never used to pull sleds. It would be like using a valuable dagger to chop firewood. If a sled dog is needed, they use another kind sturdy built and larger dog called in Russian "Yezdovaya Laika" or sled Laika. This is practiced mainly in polar tundra where reindeer have nothing to eat.

See also
 Dogs portal
 List of dog breeds

References
Sources in Russian Language:
Dmitrieva-Sulima, M., "Laika and Hunting With It", Sanct-Peterburg, 1911.  Republished by Aquarium, Moscow, 2003.
Ioannesyan, A. P., "Materials on Breeding of Hunting Dogs," "West Siberian Laika", pages 29–32, Moscow, 1990.
Vakhrushev, I. I. and M. G. Volkov, "Hunting Laikas", Zagotizdat, Moscow, 1945.
Voilochnikov, A. T. and Voilochnikova, S.D. "Laikas and Hunting With Them", Lesnaya Promyshlennost, Moscow, 1972.
Voilochnikov, A. T. and Voilochnikova, S.D. "Which Breed of Laikas is the Best?", "Hunting and Hunting Industry", issue 10, page 30 -31, 1972.
Voilochnikov, A. T. and Voilochnikova, S.D. "Hunting Laikas", Lesnaya Promyshlennost, Moscow, 1982.

Sources in English Language:
 Cherkassov, A. A., 1884, "Notes of an East Siberian Hunter", A. S. Suvorin, Sanct Peterburg.  Translated in English by Vladimir Beregovoy and Stephen Bodio and published by AuthorHouse, Bloomington, IN, 2012.
 Beregovoy, Vladimir, "Hunting Laika Breeds of Russia", Crystal Dream Publishing, USA, 2001.

Sources in German Language:
Jagdlaikarassen Russlands, 2013, Verlag Laika-Klub, Germany, Translated into German by Tina and Edda Thalis, Christine and Dieter Klingelhoeller.

Citations

External links
Photo of E. I. Shershevsky's "foundation stock" of West Siberian Laikas gathered from Ural and West Siberia for pedigree work in experimental kennel of industrial hunting dogs of All Union Institute of Hunting Industry, 1954

FCI breeds
Spitz breeds
Hunting dogs
Dog breeds originating in Russia